Nizhny Pochinok is a rural locality (a village) in Turovetskoye Rural Settlement, Mezhdurechensky District, Vologda Oblast, Russia. The population was 4 as of 2002.

Geography 
Nizhny Pochinok is located 258 km northeast of Shuyskoye (the district's administrative centre) by road. Dorovatka is the nearest rural locality.

References 

Rural localities in Mezhdurechensky District, Vologda Oblast